Elk Neck Peninsula is in Cecil County, Maryland, between the towns of Elkton and North East, Maryland. Native American and colonial travelers often canoed or sailed up the Chesapeake Bay to Elkton, where the Elk River became unnavigable, and then walked or took some form of surface transportation to the Delaware Bay watershed, since this was the shortest surface crossing. Native Americans of the area, including the Nanticoke and Lenni Lenape, hunted and fished, as well as established semi-permanent camps.

Elk Neck State Park includes the southern tip of the peninsula, bounded by the North East River, Elk River, as well as the Chesapeake Bay. Maryland Route 272 ends at the point of the peninsula, with the famous Turkey Point Light. Much of the peninsula's land is legally protected from development, either as part of the state park or as part of Elk Neck State Forest. Deep forests, bluffs, beaches and marshlands are the primary natural features of the park's landscape.

Landforms of Cecil County, Maryland
Peninsulas of Maryland